Alphonse Leroy (23 August 1742 - 15 January 1816) was a French doctor.

Life
Born Alphonse-Louis-Vincent Leroy in Rouen, he initially studied law and wished to become a lawyer, but the fame of the Rouen-born surgeon Claude-Nicolas Lecat gave him the idea of switching to medicine. He began studying medicine with Lecat before completing his studies in Paris. He was received as a Doctor-Regent in 1768 and soon afterwards as a professor in Paris' medical faculty.

He specialised in children's and women's diseases and voiced several innovations in the teaching of midwifery. He published several works - these and his skill in public speaking gained him an appointment as professor of midwifery in the Paris school of health. He was known for his impatience, stubbornness and exaggeration in debate. According to him animal substances and especially meat were always the best food for very young children. He was also a stubborn opponent of vaccination.

He was the first to hold a chair in midwifery at the medical faculty in Paris beside Jean-Louis Baudelocque. He was best known for symphysiotomy and exploited his celebrity as the second man to perform it after its inventor Jean-René Sigault. He was murdered in Paris by a servant whom he had dismissed a few days earlier.

Main works 
 Recherches sur les habillements des femmes et des enfants ou Examen de la manière dont il faut vêtir l’un et l’autre sexe, Paris, 1772
 La Pratique des accouchements, Paris, 1776
 Recherches historiques et pratiques sur la section de la symphyse du pubis, Paris, 1778
 Consultation médico-légale sur la question : l’approche de certaines femmes nuit-elle à la fermentation des liqueurs ?, Paris, 1780
 Essai sur l’histoire naturelle de la grossesse et de l’accouchement, Paris, 1787
 De la nutrition et de son influence sur la forme et la fécondité des animaux sauvages et domestiques, accompagné d'un Mémoire sur l’influence de la lumière sur l’économie animale, Paris : Impr. de Crapelet, chez C.-F. Maradan, 1798, in-8°, 4-95 p.
 Leçons sur les pertes de sang pendant la grossesse, lors et à la suite des accouchements, des fausses couches, et sur toutes les hémorragies, Paris, 1803
 Manuel des goutteux et des rhumatiques, Paris, 1803
 la Médecine maternelle, ou l’Art d’élever et de conserver les enfants, Paris, 1803
 Manuel de la saignée, 1807, in-8°
 De la conservation des femmes, Paris, 1811, in-8°
 De la Contagion régnante sur les vaches, sur les bœufs et sur l’homme, en quelques contrées de la France, des causes des contagions…, Paris : Janet et Cotelle, 1814, in-8°, IV-184 p.
 De la contagion sur l’homme, sur les vaches et sur les bœufs ; de ses moyens préservatifs et curatifs ; considérations sur les maladies des armées ; aperçu des avantages des Abattoirs dans les grandes villes, Paris : Méquignon père, 1815, in-8°, ou in-16, 15 p.

Sources 
  Antoine Laurent Jessé Bayle, Biographie médicale, v. 2, .
  Pierre Larousse, Grand Dictionnaire universel du XIXe siecle, vol. 10, Paris, Administration du grand Dictionnaire universel, p. 399.
  Florian Reynaud, Les bêtes à cornes (ou l'élevage bovin) dans la littérature agronomique de 1700 à 1850, Caen, doctoral thesis (history), 2009, appendix 2 (publications)

1742 births
1816 deaths
Physicians from Rouen
French surgeons
French obstetricians
18th-century French physicians
19th-century French physicians
People murdered in France
1816 murders in France